Jy-mel Coleman (born 13 October 1988) is a Jamaican international rugby league footballer who has played as a  or  for a number of clubs.

Background
Coleman was born in Leeds, West Yorkshire, England. He is of Jamaican heritage.

His brother Jermaine Coleman is a fellow Jamaican international.

Playing career

Club career
Coleman began his career at the London Skolars in 2010

He played for the York City Knights in 2003.

Coleman returned to play for the Skolars between 2010 and 2011.

He moved to the Keighley Cougars for 2011 and 2012.

Coleman moved to the Dewsbury Rams for 2013.

He played for the Hemel Stags between 2013 and 2015.

Coleman returned to play for the London Skolars, staying at the club between 2016 and 2019.

He played for the Gateshead Thunder in 2019.

Coleman again returned to play for the London Skolars in 2019 through to 2021.

He left to play for Hunslet in 2021.

International career
Coleman represented Great Britain Students in 2010.

He made his international debut for Jamaica in 2011 against South Africa.

In 2022 Coleman was named in the Jamaica squad for the 2021 Rugby League World Cup.

Coaching career
Coleman joined the London Broncos in 2022 as the assistant coach under his brother Jermaine Coleman. Both he and his brother were sacked in May 2022 following poor performances and results.

References

External links
London Broncos profile
Jamaica profile

1988 births
Living people
Dewsbury Rams players
English rugby league players
Hemel Stags players
Hunslet R.L.F.C. players
Jamaica national rugby league team players
Keighley Cougars players
London Skolars players
Newcastle Thunder players
Rugby league halfbacks
Rugby league five-eighths
Rugby league players from Leeds
York City Knights players